Living for the Weekend or Livin' for the Weekend may refer to:

Albums
Living for the Weekend (The Saturdays album), 2013
Livin' for the Weekend: The Anthology, a 2012 compilation album by Triumph
Living for the Weekend, an album by Jill Jones, on Peace Bisquit label 2009

Songs
"Living for the Weekend" (Hard-Fi song)
"Livin' for the Weekend" (Dina Carroll song)
"Livin' for the Weekend" (The O'Jays song)
"Living for the Weekend", song by Rockers Revenge, 1984